Stellbergsee is a lake in Söhre, Landkreis Kassel and Schwalm-Eder-Kreis, Hesse, Germany. At an elevation of 356 m, its surface area is 0.014 km².

Lakes of Hesse
North Hesse